= Tenement houses of the Partnership of Petrovsky trade lines in Moscow =

Monument in Moscow, Russia

- Доходные дома "Товарищества Петровских торговых линий в Москве»
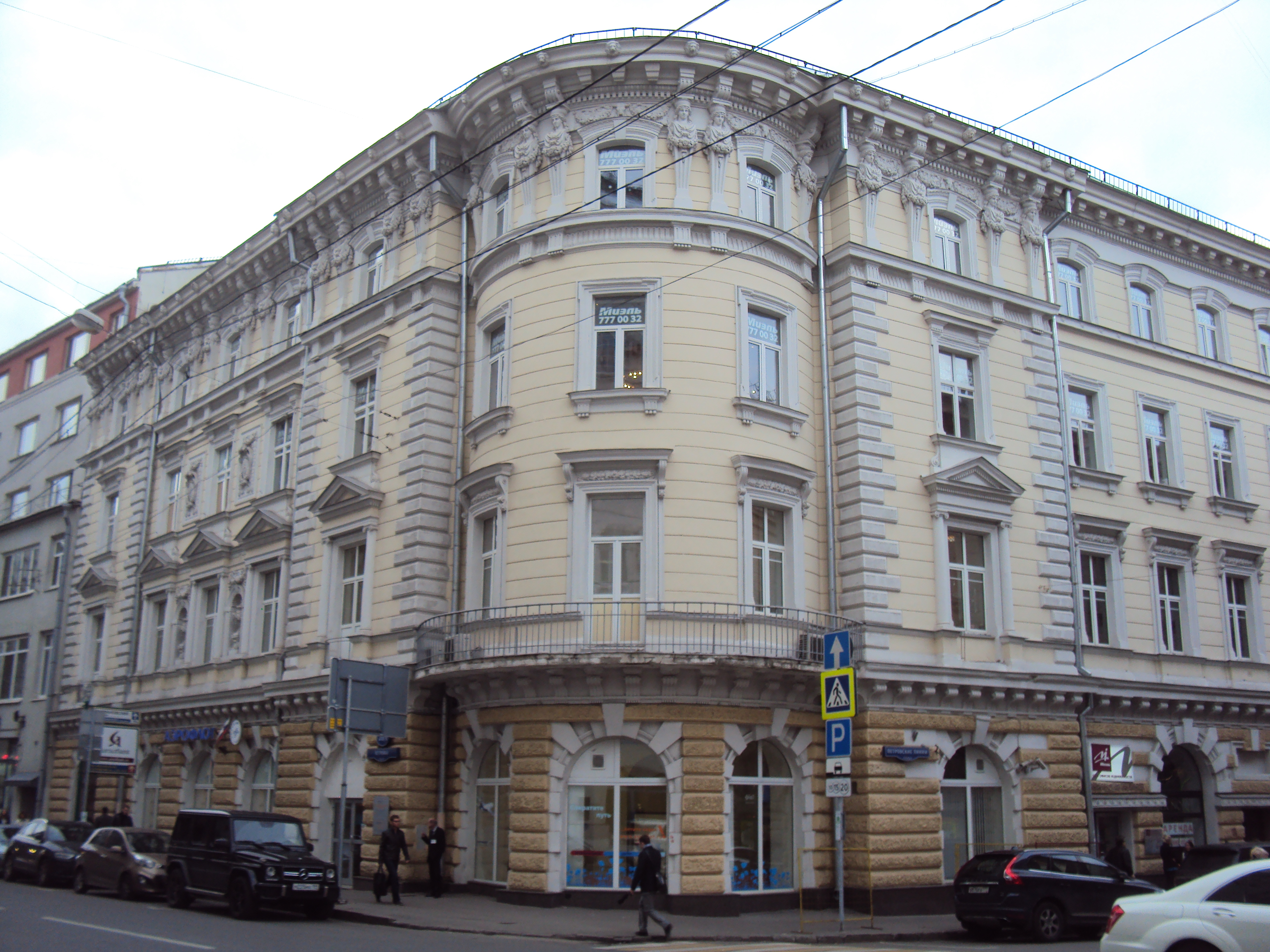
- Interactive map of Tenement houses of the Partnership of Petrovsky trade lines in Moscow
- Location: Moscow, Petrovsky Lines st.
- Coordinates: 55°45′50″N 37°37′07″E

The tenement houses of the "Partnership of Petrovsky trade lines in Moscow" (Russian: Доходные дома "Товарищества Петровских торговых линий в Москве") is a complex of buildings on Petrovsky Lines Street in Moscow, including two houses opposite each other (№ 1 and № 2 on Petrovskie Lines, or № 20 and 18 on Petrovka Street). Built in 1876 by the architect B. V. Freidenberg. The complex of apartment houses has the status of an object of cultural heritage of federal significance.

== History and description ==
In the second half of the 19th century, the Association of Petrovsky trade lines, founded by the entrepreneur and philanthropist V. I. Yakunchikov, acquired a plot of land between the streets of Petrovka and Neglinnaya. Before that, there were the possessions of Prince N. A. Kasatkin-Rostovsky (on the site of the house 1/20/21) and the estate of the Titovs (on the site of the house № 2/18/19). On the site according to the project of B. V. Freidenberg, two apartment houses were built opposite each other. The design was also attended by architect K. K. Gippius, engineers K. I. Shestakov and A. N. Cardo-Sysoev.

With the construction of these two apartment houses, the Petrovsky Lines, which had not existed before, was formed. The semicircular wings of the houses that appear on Petrovka are mirror images of each other. The rectangular wings on the Neglinnaya side are also symmetrically constructed. The buildings are decorated in the spirit of classicized eclecticism.

In the southern building (№ 2/18/19) the hotel "Russia" is located. The area before the entrance to the hotel was originally designed in the form of a semicircular niche and was the compositional center of the architectural complex. In the 1900s, the restaurant "Empire" (then "Elite" and "Budapest") appeared on the place of the semicircular platform, after which the site turned into a terrace of the second floor. Around the same time, a cinema was opened on the second floor of the rotundal part overlooking Petrovka, as well as the Petrovsky Theater of Miniatures. In the Northern building (№ 1/20/21) at the turn of the 19th and 20th centuries the bookshop "Znanie", the publishing house I. N. Kebel, the newspaper "Courier" was located.

The upper floors of the houses were handed over to the apartments. In 1878–1883 in the Northern building there lived scientists S. V. Kovalevskaya and V. O. Kovalevsky.

After the October Revolution, the southern building was named "Second House of Unions". On November 26, 1918, at the meeting of the delegates of the Moscow Central Workers' Cooperative, Lenin spoke. On April 11, 1919, Lenin attended the meeting of the All-Union Central Council of Trade Unions in Moscow.
